Moses A. Farrow  (born 1978) is a family therapist. The adopted son of actress Mia Farrow and director Woody Allen, he is also known for having come to the defense of his father against a sexual abuse allegation.

Early life and education
Moses Amadeus Farrow was born in South Korea with cerebral palsy, and was adopted by American actress Mia Farrow and film director Woody Allen in December 1991. He played a small role in Allen's 1986 film Hannah and Her Sisters.

Farrow attended the Dalton School in New York City, and received his undergraduate degree from Siena College, and his master's degree from the University of Connecticut.

Relationship with Woody Allen and Mia Farrow
On August 13, 1992, Allen sued for custody of Moses Farrow, who was called to submit written testimony by Mia Farrow's attorneys. In a letter addressed to Allen and read to the court Moses, then age 14, declared that he did not consider Allen his father anymore. In subsequent media interviews, Moses told reporters that he was "sure my younger brother and sister don't want to go with him either." Mia Farrow was ultimately granted custody of Moses and attempted to have Allen's adoption of Moses annulled, though a court denied her request.

Years later as an adult, however, Farrow reunited with Allen and severed ties with Mia Farrow. In one People magazine interview in February 2014, Farrow defended his adopted father, rejecting public accusations made by his younger sister, Dylan Farrow, of child sexual abuse against Allen, saying, "I don't know if my sister really believes she was molested or is trying to please her mother. Pleasing my mother was very powerful motivation because to be on her wrong side was horrible." In that same interview, he described Mia Farrow as "vengeful" and his childhood being raised by her as "horrifying", claiming that she was physically abusive toward him.

In 2018, Farrow published a blog called "A Son Speaks Out," in which he argued for Allen's innocence, accused Mia Farrow of abuse, and offered a different version of his childhood from that given by some of his siblings.

In a December 2020 interview with The Guardian, Farrow said he would be happy to take his adopted father's surname.

Footage of Farrow appears in the documentary Allen v. Farrow even though he declined to participate.

Career
Farrow has been a licensed marriage and family therapist in the state of Connecticut since 2007, and is currently the adoption program coordinator for Lutheran Social Services of New England. He specializes in adoption trauma therapy, especially among children who have been adopted by parents of a different racial group.

Personal life
Farrow lives with his family in Connecticut.

References

External links

"A Son Speaks Out"
 

Living people
American adoptees
American people of South Korean descent
Dalton School alumni
Family therapists
Siena College alumni
People with cerebral palsy
South Korean people with disabilities
South Korean people
University of Connecticut alumni
1978 births